is a women's football club playing in Japan's football league, WE League. Its hometown is the city of Sendai.

Kits

Kit suppliers and shirt sponsors

Stadium

Their home stadium is Yurtec Stadium Sendai, in Izumi-ku, Sendai, although a few home games have also been played at nearby Miyagi Stadium.

Sendai Stadium ranks among the top stadiums in Japan for its presence, comfort, and accessibility, and was once ranked second in an evaluation by a famous Japanese football media.It was also used by Azzurri as a camp site during the 2002 FIFA World Cup.

Miyagi Stadium is famous not only for the Japanese national team, but also for hosting matches of the Argentine national team in the 2002 FIFA World Cup.

Mascot

Myviy
First appearance at the Tokyo Girls Collection in February 2021.
A girl from Deneb and raised in Sendai. LTAANA and VEGATTA are friends.
By combining "MY" from My Navi and "V" from Victory, the club named it "Myviy" as an easy-to-call name that will be familiar to many people, including supporters.
Not a specific animal. A character inspired by the star Deneb, one of the summer triangles. The motif is Mynavi Wave, a moon helmet that is associated with the stars and the city of Sendai.

Players

First-team squad

Type 2
Type 2
Type 2

Famous players 

 Aya Sameshima 2012-2014
 Nana Ichise 2016-
 Caitlin Foord 2017
 Mamiko Matsumoto 2020-
 Fuka Nagano 2021
 Hinata Niyazawa 2021-
 Emi Nakajima 2022-

Club staff

Honours

Domestic
Nadeshiko League Division 1
Runners-up (1): 2015,

Nadeshiko League Division 2
Winners (1): 2012,

Season-by-season records

Parent company
Mynavi Corporation

Transition of team name
Vegalta Sendai Ladies: (2012–2016)
Mynavi Vegalta Sendai Ladies: (2017–2020)
Mynavi Sendai Ladies: (2021–present)

See also
Japan Football Association (JFA)
List of women's football clubs in Japan
Vegalta Sendai (former parent company)

References

External links
Official website

Vegalta Sendai
Women's football clubs in Japan
2012 establishments in Japan
Japan Women's Football League teams
Sports teams in Sendai
Association football clubs established in 2012
WE League clubs